Modern School is situated in Sector 17, Faridabad.

See also
Education in India
Literacy in India  
List of institutions of higher education in Haryana

References

External links

Schools in Haryana
Faridabad